Isla Pájaros Niños is an inshore island near Algarrobo, Chile some 6.17 hectares in size. It is home to a colony of 250-500 Humboldt penguins and Magellanic penguins which can be viewed from a nearby hilltop using binoculars. Access to the island is restricted to members of the adjacent yacht club. The breakwater which connects the island to the mainland was constructed in 1977 and 1978. At that time, the island was estimated to support 800 penguins. The island was declared a Protected Area in 1978.

References 

Islands of Chile
Protected areas of Chile